Fairfax House is a Georgian townhouse located at No. 27, Castlegate, York, England, near Clifford's Tower and York Castle Museum. It was probably built in the early 1740s for a local merchant and in 1759 it was purchased by Charles Gregory Fairfax, 9th Viscount Fairfax of Emley, who arranged for the interior to be remodelled by John Carr (architect). After the Viscount's death in 1772, the house was sold and subsequently passed through a number of local families before spending some time as a Gentleman's Club, a Building Society and a cinema. The property was bought by York Civic Trust in the 1980s and completely restored to its former grandeur. Fairfax House is now a museum open to the public and a Grade I listed building.

History
In 1761, Viscount Fairfax employed the Yorkshire architect John Carr to remodel the house at 27 Castlegate.  The work was completed in 1765. The interior has some of Yorkshire's finest mid-C18 plasterwork by James Henderson (fl. c. 1755–1778) and Giuseppe (Joseph) Cortese (fl. c. 1745–1778) and carved woodwork. The wrought iron balustrades on the staircases were by Maurice Tobin (fl. 1762)  Wrought iron gates and railings fronting Castlegate were removed when the street was widened, but were recorded by York architect and artist Ridsdale Tait.

Viscount Fairfax died in 1772 and his title became extinct. Subsequent occupants included Sir Walter Vavasour, 6th Baronet of Haslewood (1780), William Danby (1787), Peregrine Wentworth (1792), Sir John Lister Kaye, 1st Baronet Lister-Kaye of Grange (1820) and Mrs Ann Mary Pemberton (1840–65).  At some point after this, Fairfax House, renamed St. George's Hall, became neglected and fell into disrepair, and in the late 19th and early 20th century, part of the property was used as a dance hall.  In 1921, St George's Cinema, adjacent to Fairfax House, was opened and the building was expanded. It closed in 1970 and the City Council acquired the dilapidated building. The City sold it to York Civic Trust, which between 1982 and 1984 under architect Francis Johnson renovated the building and turned the defunct cinema's entrance into the main entrance to Fairfax House. The York Conservation Trust subsequently purchased the house, leasing it back to the Civic Trust.

On the death in 1980 of Noel Terry (of the Terry's chocolate business), his collection of Georgian furniture and clocks was donated to York Civic Trust and subsequently housed in the period rooms of Fairfax House. The collection has since been expanded by acquisition and donation, including in summer 2017 a re-discovered wooden panel carved by Grinling Gibbons while learning his trade in York.
York Civic Trust headquarters is in the house, which is open for the public to see the rooms and exhibitions.

Gallery

References

External links

Fairfax House website

Grade I listed houses
Grade I listed buildings in York
Grade I listed museum buildings
Museums in York
Historic house museums in North Yorkshire